John Raymond Evelyn Stansfeld  (20 April 1880 – 28 September 1915) was a British army officer involved in the Relief of Ladysmith, the Battle of Spion Kop during the Boer War and the First Battle of Ypres. Stansfeld died at the Battle of Loos during World War I.  He served with the Gordon Highlanders.

Early life 
Stansfeld was born on 20 April 1880. He was the youngest child and only son of John Birkbeck Evelyn Stansfeld (1846–1911), Rector of Preston, and his wife Marie Agnes Barrenger. John Snr was the son of Rev. John Stansfield (1814–61), Vicar of Coniston Cold. His cousin, was John Stansfeld (1840–1928) of Field House, Sowerby, and Dunninald Castle, Montrose. He was a descendant of the Stansfeld family of Stansfield and Sowerby, Yorkshire, and a distant cousin of William Crompton-Stansfield, Sir James Stansfeld, James Rawdon Stansfeld and Thomas Wolryche Stansfeld.

Stansfeld was educated at Uppingham School where in 1896 he was awarded the school's Silver Medal for winning the annual boxing competition; the school magazine described him as an "all round athlete of the highest possible promise".

Military career 

Stansfeld entered the Royal Military Academy Sandhurst after successfully passing the infantry Competitive Examination in 1898.  At Sandhurst he won the heavyweight boxing championship and captained the football team; he passed out in June 1899 having been awarded the Sword of Honour. Four months later he was gazetted into the 2nd Battalion, Gordon Highlanders as 2nd Lieutenant succeeding Matthew Fontaine Maury Meiklejohn. He received orders to immediately join the battalion in the Boer War in South Africa who were then at the front in Natal.

He served in the Boer War in South Africa (1899–1902), and was present at the Relief of Ladysmith, Colneso, Tugela Heights, and the Battle of Spion Kop. At Spion Kop, he helped wounded soldiers while under fire, for which he was appointed a Companion of the Distinguished Service Order (DSO) in 1900. He was also twice mentioned in despatches (1901). He received the Queen's medal with six clasps and the King's medal with two clasps.  Stansfeld later served in India and Egypt (1910–14), at Sialkot, Peshawar, Calcutta and Cawnpore, and participated in the Delhi Durbar (1911), before returning to Europe in 1914.

He was mentioned in dispatches three times during the Boer War.

First World War

He returned from Egypt to the early fighting in Belgium and was wounded during the First Battle of Ypres.  He returned to the front after three weeks' leave, and was again mentioned in dispatches.  He participated in the famous Christmas truce at the end of the first year of the Great War and wrote home to his wife about it,

He was mentioned in dispatches twice.

He was promoted to major and lieutenant colonel.

In March 1915 at the Battle of Neuve Chapelle, Stansfeld was wounded for a second time, receiving a shrapnel wound to his shoulder.  He was hospitalised at Warley, Essex then spent some time recuperating with his uncle at Dunninald. He was soon back at the front commanding the 2nd Gordons at the Battle of Loos. Within minutes of the start of the battle on 25 September Stansfeld was wounded in both legs; he was stretchered away and his right leg amputated. He died of his wounds three days later on 28 September at a field dressing station in Chocques. Lieutenant-Colonel Stansfeld was one of 54 British Empire Commanding Officers killed or wounded at that battle.

Memorial and burial
As reported in the Craven Herald Article Date: 22 October 1915, a memorial service was held in October at St. Mary's Church, Montrose, Angus (presumably the antecedent of the present Saints Mary and Peter).  Walter Robberds, The Most Reverend the Primus of the Scottish Episcopal Church and Bishop of Brechin officiated.  A regimental contingent was present, including officers and wounded enlisted men.  The "choral celebration of the Holy Communion ...  [hymns] included 'Onward, Christian Soldiers,' 'Come, Holy Ghost, our souls inspire,' and 'For all the Saints,' ... [and] the tenor solo in the Benedictus, 'Blessed is He that cometh,' to organ accompaniment."  After a eulogy, the service concluded with the organ and orchestra playing Chopin's Funeral March, singing of God Save the King (the National Anthem), and cornets intoning The Last Post.

Lieutenant-Colonel Stansfield is buried at the Chocques Military Cemetery in France.

He is honored in The Royal Memorial Chapel, Chapel Square, Royal Military Academy, Sandhurst.  So too, on a plaque installed at Craig Parish Church.

Family 
In 1904, Stansfeld married Constance Yolonde de Bourbel de Montpincon the daughter of Major-General Raoul de Bourbel, 8th Marquis de Montpincon (1830–1904). They had one son, Captain John de Bourbel Stansfeld, MC (1905–57) of Dunninald Castle, Scotland.

References

External links
Lt. Col. John Raymond Evelyn Stansfeld at Find a Grave
 The Royal Memorial Chapel, Chapel Square, Royal Military Academy, Sandhurst
 

1880 births
1915 deaths
British Army personnel of the Second Boer War
Companions of the Distinguished Service Order
Stansfeld family
People educated at Uppingham School
Graduates of the Royal Military College, Sandhurst
Gordon Highlanders officers
British Army personnel of World War I
British military personnel killed in World War I
Participants of the Christmas truce of 1914